The Tanzania–Zambia Petroleum Products Pipeline (TZPPP) is a proposed pipeline to transport refined petroleum products from Tanzania's sea-port of Dar es Salaam on the Indian Ocean through central Tanzania and northern Zambia to the Zambian mining city of Ndola, in the Copperbelt Province.

Location
The pipeline would originate in Dar es Salaam, Tanzania's financial capital and largest city and travel in a general south-westerly direction, through the Tanzanian regions of Morogoro, Iringa,  Njombe, Mbeya and Songwe.

Overview
Zambia, a land-locked Southern African country depends on its neighbor, Tanzania for the majority of its oil imports, sourced mainly from the Middle Eastern countries. This pipeline would ease the transportation of petroleum products to Zambia and to many inland regions of Tanzania, where the pipeline will pass.

Other pipelines
The two countries already have an oil pipeline between them, the Tanzania–Zambia Crude Oil Pipeline.

See also
 East African Crude Oil Pipeline
 Lobito–Lusaka Oil Products Pipeline

References

External links
Tanzania, Zambia Plan $1.5 Billion Oil Products Pipeline: Tanzania Minister As of 28 May 2019.

Proposed energy infrastructure in Tanzania
Proposed energy infrastructure in Zambia
Oil pipelines in Tanzania
Oil pipelines in Zambia